Rheumatobates vegatus is a species of water strider in the family Gerridae. It is found in the Caribbean Sea, Central America, and North America.

References

Rhagadotarsinae
Articles created by Qbugbot
Insects described in 1942